The 3521 Class were forty tank locomotives designed by William Dean to haul passenger trains on the Great Western Railway. They were introduced as 0-4-2T locomotives in 1887, but were quickly altered to become 0-4-4Ts to improve their running. Following two serious accidents they were further altered from 1899 to run as 4-4-0 tender locomotives, in which form the last was withdrawn in 1934.

Locomotives

0-4-2T standard gauge
The first twenty locomotives were turned out in 1887 as 0-4-2T locomotives for services on the  lines.

 3521
 3522
 3523
 3524
 3525
 3526
 3527
 3528
 3529
 3530
 3531
 3532
 3533
 3534
 3535
 3536
 3537
 3538
 3539
 3540

0-4-2T broad gauge
In 1888 a further batch of twenty were ordered as 0-4-2ST saddle tanks for the  broad gauge lines in Devon and Cornwall.

 3541 (1888 - 1890)
 3542 (1888 - 1891)
 3543 (1888 - 1891)
 3544 (1888 - 1890)
 3545 (1888 - 1891)
 3546 (1888 - 1890)
 3547 (1888 - 1891)
 3548 (1888 - 1891)
 3549 (1888 - 1891)
 3550 (1888 - 1890)
 3551 (1888 - 1890)
 3552 (1888 - 1890)
 3553 (1888 - 1890)
 3554 (1889 - 1891)
 3555 (1889 - 1890)
 3556 (1889 - 1890)
 3557 (1889 - 1891)
 3558 (1889 - 1890)
 3559 (1889 - 1890)

0-4-4T broad gauge

Due to the unsteady running of the 0-4-2STs, the last of the order, 3560, was turned out in August 1889 as a 0-4-4T bogie side tank.
 
 3541 (1890 - 1892)
 3542 (1891 - 1892)
 3544 (1890 - 1892)
 3545 (1891 - 1892)
 3546 (1890 - 1892)
 3548 (1891 - 1892)
 3549 (1891 - 1892)
 3550 (1890 - 1892)
 3551 (1890 - 1892)
 3552 (1890 - 1892)
 3553 (1890 - 1892)
 3554 (1891 - 1892)
 3555 (1890 - 1892)
 3556 (1890 - 1892)
 3557 (1891 - 1892)
 3558 (1890 - 1892)
 3559 (1890 - 1892)
 3560 (1889 - 1892)

0-4-4T standard gauge

The standard gauge 0-4-2Ts were converted to 0-4-4Ts in the same manner as the broad gauge locomotives, which were all eventually converted to standard gauge. By the end of 1892 the whole class of forty locomotives was to one standard design for the first time.

 3521
 3522
 3523
 3524
 3525
 3526
 3527
 3528
 3529
 3530
 3531
 3532
 3533
 3534
 3535
 3536
 3537
 3538
 3539
 3540
 3541 (1892 - )
 3542 (1892 - )
 3543 (1891 - )
 3544 (1892 - )
 3545 (1892 - )
 3546 (1892 - )
 3547 (1891 - )
 3548 (1892 - )
 3549 (1892 - )
 3550 (1892 - )
 3551 (1892 - )
 3552 (1892 - )
 3553 (1892 - )
 3554 (1892 - )
 3555 (1892 - )
 3556 (1892 - )
 3557 (1892 - )
 3558 (1892 - )
 3559 (1892 - )
 3560 (1892 - 1899)

4-4-0 standard gauge
All forty 0-4-4T locomotives were rebuilt as 4-4-0 tender locomotives between 1899 and 1902. Twenty-six locos retained their parallel domed boilers while fourteen received new Standard No 3 parallel domeless boilers (later replaced by the taper barrel version of that type). (Holcroft states that twenty-six received Standard No 3 boilers.)

Holcroft was of the opinion that the original inside and outside frames were modified whereas Le Fleming was of the opinion that new inside frames would have been required.  However, as the modification also increased the coupled wheelbase from 7 ft 4 in to 8 ft 6 in it is unlikely that much of the original framing was re-used.

Two locomotives, 3521 and 3546, were transferred to the Cambrian Railways in 1921 to replace locomotives destroyed in the Abermule accident. They were allocated Cambrian numbers 82 and 95 respectively but these were never carried, the two locomotives being returned to the Great Western Railway with their original numbers when the two railways were grouped together in 1922.

Accidents and incidents
In 1898,  locomotive 3542 derailed near Penryn, Cornwall whilst hauling a mail train. The locomotive rolled down an embankment, killing the driver. The accident was caused by a combination of the condition of the track and the locomotive oscillating. Following this the whole class was rebuilt as 4-4-0 tender locomotives.

References

 
 
 
 
 

3521
Broad gauge (7 feet) railway locomotives
0-4-2T locomotives
0-4-4T locomotives
4-4-0 locomotives
Railway locomotives introduced in 1887
Standard gauge steam locomotives of Great Britain
Scrapped locomotives
Passenger locomotives